The Dâw are an indigenous people of Brazil. They live on the right bank of Rio Negro in an area commonly known as Alto Rio Negro in the Amazon rainforest. They share this area together with a number of other indigenous peoples, including the other Nadahup people, which they are closely related to, such as the Nadëb, the Nukak, and the Hup - but also Arawakan peoples, and Tucanoan peoples, such as the Barasana and Tucano.

The word Dâw is a self-designation, meaning people. In literature, as well as in Alto Rio Negro, they are often referred to as Kamã, but this is considered very pejorative.

During the 1980s the Dâw were close to extinction due to an unbalance between the number of men and women. There were only few women, and many of the women left were old and unable to carry a child. In 1984, the number of Dâw was only 56. Since then the situation has improved considerably, and the Dâw are no longer threatened by extinction in spite of the low population. Today, all Dâw have the Dâw language as their first language, while many also speak Nheengatu and Portuguese.

Today, the Dâw are in a permanent contact with non-indigenous people, mostly in the nearby city, São Gabriel da Cachoeira.

References

Notes

General 
 
 

Indigenous peoples of the Amazon
Rio Negro (Amazon)
Indigenous peoples in Brazil